Duplicate: List of Falkland Islands-related topics

The following is an alphabetical list of topics related to the British Overseas Territory of the Falkland Islands.

0–9

.fk – Internet country code top-level domain for the Falkland Islands
1966 Aerolineas Argentinas DC-4 hijacking
1982 invasion of the Falkland Islands
1982 Liberation Memorial
COVID-19 pandemic in the Falkland Islands

A
Aerospatiale SS.12/AS.12
Ajax Bay
Alan Huckle
Americas
South America
South Atlantic Ocean
Falkland Islands
Anglo-America
Anthony Cary, 5th Viscount of Falkland
ARA Almirante Domecq Garcia (D23)
ARA Almirante Irízar (Q-5)
ARA Bahía Buen Suceso
ARA General Belgrano
ARA Isla de los Estados

ARA Santa Fe
Argentine air forces in the Falklands War
Argentine ground forces in the Falklands War
Argentine names for the Falkland Islands
Argentine naval forces in the Falklands War
Arnold Weinholt Hodson
Ascension Island
Atlantic Conveyor
Atlantic Ocean
Atlas of the Falkland Islands

B
Barren Island (Falkland Islands)
Battle of Goose Green
Battle of Mount Harriet
Battle of Mount Longdon
Battle of Mount Tumbledown
Battle of the Falkland Islands, a naval engagement during World War I
Battle of Two Sisters
Battle of Wireless Ridge
Beauchene Island
Beaver Island (Falkland Islands)
Bishop of the Falkland Islands
Black-necked swan
Bleaker Island
Bodie Suspension Bridge
British air services in the Falklands War
British Forces Broadcasting Service
British ground forces in the Falklands War
British Nationality (Falkland Islands) Act 1983
British naval forces in the Falklands War
British Overseas Territory of the Falkland Islands
Byron Sound

C
Calm Head
Camp (Falkland Islands)
Camp (constituency)
Cape Meredith
Capital of the Falkland Islands: Stanley on East Falkland
Carcass Island
Casualties of the Battle of Bluff Cove
Categories:
:Category:Falkland Islands
:Category:Buildings and structures in the Falkland Islands
:Category:Communications in the Falkland Islands
:Category:Economy of the Falkland Islands
:Category:Education in the Falkland Islands
:Category:Environment of the Falkland Islands
:Category:Falkland Islands culture
:Category:Falkland Islands people
:Category:Falkland Islands stubs
:Category:Falkland Islands-related lists
:Category:Geography of the Falkland Islands
:Category:Government of the Falkland Islands
:Category:History of the Falkland Islands
:Category:Military of the Falkland Islands
:Category:Politics of the Falkland Islands
:Category:Sport in the Falkland Islands
:Category:Transport in the Falkland Islands
commons:Category:Falkland Islands
Catholic Church in the Falkland Islands
Chartres River
Choiseul Sound
Chris Simpkins
Christ Church Cathedral (Falkland Islands)
Cities in the Falkland Islands
Coat of arms of the Falkland Islands
Coins of the Falkland Islands pound
Colin Roberts (diplomat)
Commonwealth of Nations
Communications in the Falkland Islands
Cultural impact of the Falklands War
Culture of the Falkland Islands

D
Darwin, Falkland Islands
Demographics of the Falkland Islands
Desire the Right Party

E
East Falkland
Economy of the Falkland Islands
Elinor Frances Vallentin
Engle Passage
English colonization of the Americas
English language
Escuadrón Fénix
Events leading to the Falklands War
Ewen Southby-Tailyour
Executive Council of the Falkland Islands

F
Falklands Conservation
Falklands Day
Falkland, adjective
Falkland Island, adjective
Falkland Island fox
Falkland Islander, citizen of the Falkland Islands
Falkland Islands
Falkland Islands Association
Falkland Islands at the 2006 Commonwealth Games
Falkland Islands at the Commonwealth Games
Falkland Islands Community School
Falkland Islands Company
Falkland Islands Defence Force
Falkland Islands Dependencies Survey
Falkland Islands Gazette
Falkland Islands General Employees Union
Falkland Islands Holdings
Falkland Islands Football League
Falkland Islands Magazine
Falkland Islands Museum and National Trust
Falkland Islands national badminton team
Falkland Islands national cricket team
Falkland Islands national football team
Falkland Islands placenames
Falkland Islands pound
The Falklands Play
Falkland Islands Radio Service
Falkland Islands Rifle Association
Falkland Sound
Falklands War (1982)
Flag of the Falkland Islands
Fox Bay

G
Gavin Short
Geography of the Falkland Islands
Geology of the Falkland Islands
George Island
George Rennie (sculptor and politician)
Golding Island
Goose Green
Government House, Falkland Islands
Governor of the Falkland Islands
Gran Malvina
Grand Jason Island
Gypsy Cove

H
H. Jones
Harrier Attack
Hill Cove
History of South Georgia and the South Sandwich Islands
History of the Falkland Islands
HMS Antelope (F170)
HMS Ardent (F184)
HMS Cardiff (D108)
HMS Coventry (D118)
HMS Endurance (1967)
HMS Exeter (D89)
HMS Glamorgan (D19)
HMS Glasgow (D88)
HMS Sheffield (D80)
Hornsby Mountains
Hoste Inlet
Howard Pearce

I
Ian John McKay
International Organization for Standardization (ISO)
ISO 3166-1 alpha-2 country code for the Falkland Islands: FK
ISO 3166-1 alpha-3 country code for the Falkland Islands: FLK
Isla Soledad
Islands of the Falkland Islands
East Falkland
West Falkland

J
Jack's Mountain
Jane Cameron National Archives
Jason Islands
John Middleton (administrator)
Johnson's Harbour
Jorge Anaya

K
Keppel Island
Keppel Sound
King George Bay

L
Lafonia (peninsula)
Landmines in the Falkland Islands
Legislative Assembly of the Falkland Islands
Legislative Council of the Falkland Islands
Leopoldo Galtieri
Liberation Day (Falkland Islands)
Lists related to the Falkland Islands:
List of Argentine names for the Falkland Islands
List of cities in the Falkland Islands
List of Falkland Islands by-elections
List of Falkland Islands placenames
List of Falkland Islands-related topics
List of islands of the Falkland Islands
Listed buildings in the Falkland Islands
List of rivers of the Falkland Islands
List of settlements in the Falkland Islands
List of valleys of the Falkland Islands
Topic outline of the Falkland Islands
Lively Island
Louis Baillon
Luis Vernet

M
MacBride Head
Margaret Thatcher
Marion Island
Max Hastings
Mike Rendell
Military of the Falkland Islands
Mount Maria
Mount Usborne
Murrell River

N
New Island
Nigel Haywood
Nigel Phillips
No 6 mine
Norland

O
Occupation of the Falkland Islands
Oerlikon 35 mm twin cannon
Operation Algeciras
Operation Azul
Operation Black Buck
Operation Corporate
Operation Journeyman
Operation Keyhole
Operation Paraquet
Operation Purple Warrior
Operation Rosario
Operation Sutton
Origins of Falkland Islanders

P
Passage Islands
Peat Cutting Monday
Pebble Island
Penguin News
Peter Carington, 6th Baron Carrington
Placenames in the Falkland Islands
Politics of the Falkland Islands
Port Albemarle
Port Egmont
Port Howard
Port Louis, Falkland Islands
Port San Carlos
Port Stanley Airport
Port Stephens
Postage stamps and postal history of the Falkland Islands
Public holidays in the Falkland Islands
Puerto Soledad

Q
Quaker Harbour
Quaker Island, Falkland Islands

R
RAF Mount Pleasant
Re-establishment of British rule on the Falklands (1833)
Religion in the Falkland Islands
Revenue stamps of the Falkland Islands
Rex Masterman Hunt
Richard Cockwell
Richard Stevens (Falkland Islands politician)
Rivers of the Falkland Islands
Roger Edwards (politician)
Roger Goldsworthy
Roman Catholicism in the Falkland Islands
Roy Cove
Rugby union in the Falkland Islands

S
Salvador Settlement
San Carlos, Falkland Islands
Sandy Woodward
Saunders Island (Falkland Islands)
Scouting in the Falkland Islands
Sea Lion Island
Settlements in the Falkland Islands
'Sharkey' Ward
Simon Weston
South Atlantic Ocean
Southern Hemisphere
Sovereignty of the Falkland Islands
Speedwell Island
Staats Island
Stamps and postal history of the Falkland Islands
Stanley (constituency)
Stanley on East Falkland – Capital of the Falkland Islands
Steeple Jason Island
Stephen Venner
Stone run
Storm Mountain
Swan Islands

T
Tam Dalyell
Template:Falkland Islands topics
Teslyn Barkman
The Falkland Islands Journal
Timeline of the history of the Falkland Islands
Topic outline of the Falkland Islands
Transport in the Falkland Islands
Tumbledown

U
United Kingdom of Great Britain and Northern Ireland
USS Salish (ATA-187)

V
Valleys in the Falkland Islands
Volunteer Point

W
Walker Creek
Warrah River
Weapons of the Falklands War
Weddell Island
West Falkland
West Point Island
Western Hemisphere
Wickham Heights

Wikipedia:WikiProject Topic outline/Drafts/Topic outline of the Falkland Islands
William Cleaver Francis Robinson
William Lamond Allardyce

X

Y

Z

See also

List of international rankings
Lists of country-related topics
Topic outline of geography
Topic outline of South America
Topic outline of the Falkland Islands

External links

 
Falkland Islands